P&ID may refer to:

Organizations 
 Process and Industrial Developments, an engineering company engaged in a dispute with the Nigerian government

Other 
 Piping and instrumentation diagram